John Robert Murff (April 1, 1921 – November 28, 2008) was a relief pitcher in Major League Baseball who played from  through  for the Milwaukee Braves. He attended Gettysburg College.

A native of Burlington, Texas, Murff started his professional baseball career in A and AA ball. On June 8, 1951, while pitching for the Texas City Texans, he threw a no-hitter against the Harlingen Capitals. A year later, he pitched  innings of a 20-inning game, in a lost cause against the Texarkana Bears, who defeated the Texans, 3–2. Then, in 1955, he won The Sporting News Minor League Player of the Year Award and was named Texas League Pitcher of the Year after going 27–11 for the Dallas Eagles.

Murff entered the majors in 1956 with the Braves as a 35-year-old rookie, having been signed by Milwaukee scout Earle W. Halstead. In a story chronicled in Murff's biography "The Scout", Halstead negotiated with Dick Burnett, owner of the Dallas Eagles in the Texas League, where Murff played. The two sides reached an impasse until Halstead proposed a game of gin rummy with the winner setting the terms of the trade. Halstead won and the Braves paid Burnett $40,000 and three players from the 40 man roster to obtain Murff's contract. In part of two seasons, he posted a 2–2 record with a 4.65 ERA and three saves in 26 appearances, including two starts, giving up 26 earned runs on 56 hits and 18 walks while striking out 31 in  innings of work.

Following his majors career, Murff coached in the minors and managed the 1960 Jacksonville Braves of the South Atlantic League. As a scout for the New York Mets, he discovered and signed future Hall of Famer pitcher Nolan Ryan and All-Star catcher Jerry Grote. Ryan, later named president of the Texas Rangers, noted his friendship with Murff in his 1999 Hall of Fame induction speech.

In the early 1970s, Murff helped start the University of Mary Hardin-Baylor baseball program, and retired to Tyler, Texas in 1991 after serving 34 years as a scout. He was inducted into the Texas Baseball Hall of Fame in 1989 and the Texas Scouts Association Hall of Fame in 1999, and in 1994 the UMHB's ballpark was named in his honour, Red Murff Field.

Murff died in a Tyler nursing home at the age of 87.

Further reading
SABR BioProject

External links
, or Baseball Almanac

1921 births
2008 deaths
Atlanta Braves scouts
Baseball players from Texas
Baton Rouge Red Sticks players
Gettysburg Bullets baseball players
Dallas Eagles players
Houston Astros scouts
Industriales de Valencia players
Jacksonville Braves players
Louisville Colonels (minor league) players
Major League Baseball pitchers
Mary Hardin–Baylor Crusaders baseball coaches
Milwaukee Braves players
Minor league baseball managers
Montreal Expos scouts
Nashville Vols players
New York Mets scouts
Texas City Texans players
Tyler East Texans players
Wichita Braves players
People from Milam County, Texas